The Hoblit House is a historic house located at 505 N. College Ave. in Lincoln, Illinois. The house was constructed in 1874 for Harrison and Matilda Schuler. Architect George W. Gale designed the house in the Italianate style. The design features an asymmetrical cruciform plan, tall, narrow arched windows, a cornice with decorative bracketing, and quoins at the corners. In 1882, Frank Hoblit, a prominent Logan County banker, bought the house, which he occupied until his 1914 death.

The house was added to the National Register of Historic Places on May 22, 2007.

References

Houses on the National Register of Historic Places in Illinois
Italianate architecture in Illinois
Houses completed in 1874
Houses in Logan County, Illinois
National Register of Historic Places in Logan County, Illinois